In the universities of Oxford, Cambridge, and Dublin, Bachelors of Arts are promoted to the degree of Master of Arts or Master in Arts (MA) on application after six or seven years' seniority as members of the university (including years as an undergraduate). It is an academic rank indicating seniority, and not an additional postgraduate qualification, and within the universities there are in fact no postgraduate degrees which result in the postnominals 'MA'. No further examination or study is required for this promotion and it is equivalent to undergraduate degrees awarded by other universities.

This practice differs from most other universities worldwide, at which the degree reflects further postgraduate study or achievement. These degrees are therefore sometimes referred to as the Oxford and Cambridge MA and the Dublin or Trinity MA, to draw attention to the difference. However, as with gaining a postgraduate degree from another university, once incepted and promoted to a Master, the graduate no longer wears the academic dress or uses the post-nominal letters pertaining to a Bachelor of Arts, being no longer of that rank.

All three universities have other masters' (i.e. postgraduate) degrees which do require further study and examination, but these have other titles, such as Master of Letters (MLitt), Master of Philosophy (MPhil), Master of Studies (MSt), Master of Engineering (MAI, or MEng), Master of Science (MSc) or Master of Business (MBA).

In the ancient universities of Scotland, a degree with the same name is awarded as a first degree to graduates in certain subjects (see Master of Arts (Scotland)).

Requirements
In all three universities, a Bachelor of Arts may "incept" as a Master of Arts after a given lapse of time or as soon as a person is of the required academic standing. No further examinations or residence are required, but some institutions require the incipient to pay a fee.

At Oxford, the rank of MA may be conferred during or after the twenty-first term from matriculation (i.e., ordinarily seven years after joining the University) upon anyone holding an Oxford BA or Bachelor of Fine Arts (BFA) degree. An exception is that a Bachelor of Arts who attains the degree of Doctor of Philosophy may immediately incept as a Master of Arts, before the requisite number of terms have passed.
At Cambridge, the MA degree may be conferred six years after the end of the first term in residence to a person holding a Cambridge Bachelor of Arts (BA) degree. The previous requirement that the BA must have been held for two years before becoming eligible for the MA was removed as a result of the delay for many graduands receiving their BAs during the COVID-19 pandemic, although it remains the case that the BA must be held before the MA can be applied for.  The MA degree can also be awarded by the University of Cambridge to senior members of staff of the university or colleges, after three years of employment, if they have not previously graduated from Cambridge.
At Dublin, the rank of MA may be conferred to anyone who has held a Dublin BA degree (or another bachelor's degree after at least nine terms' residence) for at least three years. A fee (€637 in 2012) is payable, but is waived in the case of graduates of more than fifty years' standing.

The MA degree may be conferred in some other situations, but these are by far the most common. Details of these other instances may be found in the sections referenced.

In accordance with the formula of ad eundem gradum, a form of recognition that exists among the three universities, a graduate of Oxford, Cambridge, or Dublin who is entitled to an MA degree may be conferred with the equivalent degree at either of the other two universities without further examination. The Board of Trinity College, Dublin currently restricts its ad eundem awards to eligible members of the Dublin academic staff, or those who wish to register for a higher degree at Dublin; Cambridge restricts its awards to those "matriculated as a member of the University"; Oxford considers applicants who are undertaking a course of study or fulfil some educational role at Oxford, or who have "rendered valuable services to the University or to its members." This process is called "incorporation".

Post-nominal style
Masters of Arts of the three universities may use the post-nominal letters "MA". Although honours are awarded for the examinations leading to the BA degree (hence "BA (Hons)"), it is incorrect to use the style "MA (Hons)," as there is no examination for the MA degree. The abbreviated name of the university (Oxon, Cantab or Dubl) is therefore almost always appended in parentheses to the initials "MA" in the same way that it is to higher degrees, e.g. "John Smith, MA (Cantab), PhD (Lond)," principally so that it is clear (to those who are aware of the system) that these are nominal and unexamined degrees.

If someone incorporates from one of the above universities to another, the Latin et can be inserted between the university names, e.g. "MA (Oxon et Cantab)", etc. as opposed to "MA (Oxon), MA (Cantab)" which would indicate that the holder graduated BA at both universities.

The Oxford University Gazette and University Calendar have, since 2007, used Oxf rather than Oxon (also Camb rather than Cantab and Dub rather than Dubl) to match the style used for other universities, stating that: "It is not feasible to use the form ‘Oxon’ because to do so would entail Latinising all of the very many university names which occur in the Calendar".

This style is used equally for all degrees, with no distinction being made between incorporated, incepted, and examined MAs. However, the BA degree is not shown if the graduate has proceeded from BA to MA – "BA MA Oxf" should not appear. For example, someone who graduated BA at Oxford and proceeded to MA, studied for an MA in London, then moved to Cambridge and became an MA by incorporation, would be shown as MA Camb, MA Lond, MA Oxf (note the universities are ordered alphabetically), while someone who had graduated as both BA and MA in London is shown as BA MA Lond.

History and rationale
This system dates from the Middle Ages, when the study of the liberal arts took seven years. In the late Middle Ages most students joined their university at an earlier age than is now usual, often when aged only 14 or 15. The basic university education in the liberal arts comprised the Trivium (grammar, rhetoric and dialectic) and the Quadrivium (geometry, arithmetic, astronomy and music), and typically took seven years of full-time study.

In between matriculation and licence to teach, which was awarded at the end of an undergraduate's studies (whereafter he was incepted as a Master of Arts), he took an intermediate degree known as the baccalaureate, or degree of Bachelor of Arts. The division into trivium and quadrivium did not always correspond with the division between the studies required for the BA and MA degrees, but was adopted in Cambridge in the Tudor era and maintained long after it was abandoned elsewhere in Europe. In the University of Paris the baccalaureate was granted soon after responsions (the examination for matriculation), whereas in Oxford and Cambridge the bachelor's degree was postponed to a much later stage, and gradually developed a greater significance.

On inception and admission to the degree of Master of Arts, a student would become a full member of the university, and was allowed to vote in discussions of the house of Convocation. The new MA might then teach in the university for a specified number of years, during which time he was a 'regent' or 'regent master'. Upon completion of this work, he would become a 'non-regent master' and would either leave the university (often to become a clerk or schoolmaster or to enter the priesthood), or else remain and undertake further studies in one of the specialised or 'higher' faculties: Divinity, Canon or Civil Law, and Medicine.

Later, it became possible to study in the higher faculties as a BA, although the higher degree could not be taken until a graduate had the required seniority to incept as an MA. While the requirements for the bachelor's degree increased, those for the master's degree gradually diminished. By the 18th century, the ancient system of disputations had degenerated into a mere formality, and it was possible to satisfy the prescribed terms of residence, which formerly included compulsory attendance at set lectures, by keeping one's name on the college books. Examinations along modern lines were introduced for the BA and MA degrees in Oxford by the first great statute to reform the examination system in 1800, but the MA examination was abolished by a second statute in 1807. 

From at least the sixteenth century, the most select group of undergraduates were the noblemen (peers, eldest sons of peers or relatives of the monarch) who paid four times the normal fees and often received an MA degree after two years’ residence only, and without any formal exercises - thus bypassing the BA degree. However, they might not stay long enough to graduate.  At the universities this group was marked with gold tassels ("tufts") on their mortarboard caps, compared to the black ones that socially lower-ranking students wore. Those students of the next rank, fellow-commoners at Cambridge or Dublin, or gentlemen commoners at Oxford, paid twice the normal fee, ate with the fellows and were also excused from attending college lectures and performing their exercises for the plain BA. They could graduate a year earlier than the next category below. Nevertheless, at Cambridge both higher categories of student still had to take the Senate House Examination if they wished to have an honours degree. Commoners (at Oxford) or Pensioners (at Cambridge & Dublin) paid the standard fee and were more likely remain to graduate. Below them came servitors (at Oxford) and sizars (at Cambridge & Dublin), whose college fees were subsidised by their colleges and who in return had to fetch and carry, sweep, and serve at table. This group was much more likely to graduate. Oliver Goldsmith was a sizar: Isaac Newton was a subsizar. These privileges and humiliations were gradually removed during the nineteenth century.

Reforms in the late sixteenth century allowed some ordinary undergraduates also to bypass the BA stage: after the bachelor of arts degree, it used to be necessary to wait another three years to become a bachelor of laws or medicine, but after paying a fine it was possible to leave college after three years in residence, study at the Inns of Court or a teaching hospital in London, or abroad, and return at the five year mark for a professional bachelor's degree, allowing later progression to a doctorate, as happened in the case of William Blackstone.

Students at King's College, Cambridge, who until 1865 were all from Eton College, could until 1851 graduate BA, and in due course MA, without taking the university examinations. Students at New College, Oxford, who all used to come from Winchester College, had the same exemptions until 1834.

While the length of the undergraduate degree course has been shortened to three or four years in all subjects, all three universities still require roughly seven years to pass before the awarding of the MA degree. The shortening of the degree course reflects the fact that much of the teaching of the liberal arts was taken over by grammar schools, and undergraduates now enter universities at an older age, in most cases between 17 and 19. (It may be noted that the school-leaving certificate in France today is known as the baccalaureate.)

Durham University (first MA awarded 1838) and the University of London (first MA awarded 1840) broke away from the ancient model of England by considering the MA to be a higher degree distinct from the initial degree, awarded after further examination. However, in instituting a course of further study beyond the initial baccalaureate, these universities can be seen to have reverted to the ancient model. Almost all newer universities followed their lead, with the result that the Oxford, Cambridge and Dublin model is now the anomaly. Some followed that model for some years (allowing progressions in the same faculty such as from BSc to MSc, etc.) but changed to the newer system afterwards.

Among the "steamboat ladies", female students at Oxford and Cambridge who were awarded ad eundem University of Dublin degrees between 1904 and 1907 (at a time when their own universities refused to confer degrees upon women), some like Julia Bell obtained an MA.

Rights and privileges
The degree of Master of Arts traditionally carried various rights and privileges, the chief of which was membership of the legislative bodies of the universities – Convocation at Oxford and the Senate at Cambridge and Dublin. These were originally important decision-making bodies, approving changes to the statutes of the universities and electing various officials, including the two members of Parliament for each university. Inception to the MA degree was the principal way of becoming a member of these bodies, though it is not the only way, e.g. at Oxford Doctors of Divinity, Medicine and Civil Law were always also automatically members of Convocation. Today, the main role of Convocation and Senate is the election of the Chancellor of each university as well as the Professor of Poetry at Oxford and the High Steward at Cambridge.

The privileges accorded to MAs and other members of Convocation/Senate were formerly very important. At Oxford, until 1998 the Proctors only had the power to discipline "junior members" (those who had not been admitted to membership of Convocation), which meant that any graduate student who had incepted as an MA was immune from their authority. At Cambridge, MAs and those with MA status continue to be exempt from the rules governing the ownership of motor vehicles by students. Other privileges intended for academic staff and alumni, e.g. the right to dine at High Table, to attend Gaudies, to walk upon college lawns, etc., are in most colleges restricted to MAs, which excludes the majority of graduate students.

For Cambridge, membership of the Senate is no longer limited to the MA and in 2000, Oxford opened membership of Convocation to all graduates.

For Dublin, the right to elect senators to the upper house of the Irish parliament, Seanad Éireann, is now restricted to those who are Irish citizens and since 1918 the franchise was extended to include all graduates, not only those with an MA.

Precedence
The MA degree gives its holder a particular status in the universities' orders of precedence/seniority. In the University of Oxford a Master of Arts enjoys precedence, standing, and rank before all doctors, masters, and bachelors of the university who are not Masters of Arts, apart from Doctors of Divinity and Doctors of Civil Law.  Precedence, standing, and rank were formerly important for determining eligibility for appointments such as fellowships, but now generally have only a ceremonial significance.

MA status
In Oxford, until 2000 the university statutes required that all members of Congregation (the academic and senior staff of the university) have at least the degree of DD, DM, DCL or MA or have MA status. This linked back to the MA as the licence to teach in the university. MA status was thus routinely granted to academics from other universities who came to take up positions within the university; while it is no longer granted in this way, many members of Congregation appointed before 2000 retain MA status.

In Cambridge, the status of MA is automatically accorded to graduates of other universities studying in Cambridge who are aged 24 or older (graduate students under 24 years are given BA status). This entitles them to wear the appropriate Cambridge gown, but without strings.

For the above cases, the status is not a degree so is automatically relinquished upon leaving the University (in the case of Oxford) or completion of their degree (for Cambridge).

Recognition
In 2000, research by the Quality Assurance Agency for Higher Education showed that 62% of employers were unaware that the Cambridge MA did not represent any kind of postgraduate achievement involving study. The same survey found widespread ignorance amongst employers regarding university-level qualifications in general: 51% believed the Edinburgh MA to be a postgraduate qualification, 22% were unaware that a Doctorate in Business Administration was a higher qualification than an undergraduate Diploma of Higher Education, and 40% thought that a BA or BSc was a postgraduate degree.

In February 2011, the then Labour MP for Nottingham East, Chris Leslie, sponsored a private member's bill, the Master's Degrees (Minimum Standards) Bill 2010–12, to "prohibit universities awarding Master's degrees unless certain standards of study and assessment are met". The Bill's supporters described the practice as a "historical anachronism" and argued that unearned qualifications should be discontinued to preserve the academic integrity of the taught MA. Further, they warned that the title gave Oxbridge graduates an unfair advantage in the job market. The bill's opponents disputed that the title provided an unfair advantage in practice, noted that the QAA had previously investigated the matter and was unconcerned, and questioned whether it was desirable for Parliament to interfere in the academic procedures of autonomous universities, especially when there was no suggestion that analogous practices at Scottish universities be similarly reformed. The bill's second reading debate occurred on 21 October 2011 but ran out of time. The bill made no further progress and fell at the end of the parliamentary session.

See also
Wooden spoon (award)
Wrangler (University of Cambridge)

References

External links
Ordinances of the University of Cambridge regarding Master of Arts degree
The Oxford MA, Oriel College, Oxford
Oxbridge MA degrees under threat (BBC website)

Academic courses at the University of Cambridge
Academic courses at the University of Oxford
Education in England
Arts
Terminology of the University of Cambridge